The sulfate or sulphate ion is a polyatomic anion with the empirical formula . Salts, acid derivatives, and peroxides of sulfate are widely used in industry. Sulfates occur widely in everyday life. Sulfates are salts of sulfuric acid and many are prepared from that acid.

Spelling

"Sulfate" is the spelling recommended by IUPAC, but "sulphate" was traditionally used in British English.

Structure
The sulfate anion consists of a central sulfur atom surrounded by four equivalent oxygen atoms in a tetrahedral arrangement. The symmetry is the same as that of methane. The sulfur atom is in the +6 oxidation state while the four oxygen atoms are each in the −2 state. Organic sulfate esters, such as dimethyl sulfate, are covalent compounds and esters of sulfuric acid. The tetrahedral molecular geometry of the sulfate ion is as predicted by VSEPR theory.

Bonding

The first description of the bonding in modern terms was by Gilbert Lewis in his groundbreaking paper of 1916 where he described the bonding in terms of electron octets around each atom, that is no double bonds and a formal charge of +2 on the sulfur atom.

Later, Linus Pauling used valence bond theory to propose that the most significant resonance canonicals had two pi bonds involving d orbitals. His reasoning was that the charge on sulfur was thus reduced, in accordance with his principle of electroneutrality. The S−O bond length of 149 pm is shorter than the bond lengths in sulfuric acid of 157 pm for S−OH. The double bonding was taken by Pauling to account for the shortness of the S−O bond. Pauling's use of d orbitals provoked a debate on the relative importance of pi bonding and bond polarity (electrostatic attraction) in causing the shortening of the S−O bond. The outcome was a broad consensus that d orbitals play a role, but are not as significant as Pauling had believed.

A widely accepted description involving pπ – dπ bonding was initially proposed by Durward William John Cruickshank. In this model, fully occupied p orbitals on oxygen overlap with empty sulfur d orbitals (principally the dz2 and dx2–y2). However, in this description, despite there being some π character to the S−O bonds, the bond has significant ionic character. For sulfuric acid, computational analysis (with natural bond orbitals) confirms a clear positive charge on sulfur (theoretically +2.45) and a low 3d occupancy. Therefore, the representation with four single bonds is the optimal Lewis structure rather than the one with two double bonds (thus the Lewis model, not the Pauling model). In this model, the structure obeys the octet rule and the charge distribution is in agreement with the electronegativity of the atoms. The discrepancy between the S−O bond length in the sulfate ion and the S−OH bond length in sulfuric acid is explained by donation of p-orbital electrons from the terminal S=O bonds in sulfuric acid into the antibonding S−OH orbitals, weakening them resulting in the longer bond length of the latter.

However, the bonding representation of Pauling for sulfate and other main group compounds with oxygen is still a common way of representing the bonding in many textbooks. The apparent contradiction can be cleared if one realizes that the covalent double bonds in the Lewis structure in reality represent bonds that are strongly polarized by more than 90% towards the oxygen atom. On the other hand, in the structure with a dipolar bond, the charge is localized as a lone pair on the oxygen.

Preparation
Methods of preparing metal sulfates include:
treating metal, metal hydroxide, metal carbonate or metal oxide with sulfuric acid

oxidation of metal sulfides or sulfites

Properties
There are numerous examples of ionic sulfates, many of which are highly soluble in water. Exceptions include calcium sulfate, strontium sulfate, lead(II) sulfate, and barium sulfate, which are poorly soluble. Radium sulfate is the most insoluble sulfate known. The barium derivative is useful in the gravimetric analysis of sulfate: if one adds a solution of most barium salts, for instance barium chloride, to a solution containing sulfate ions, barium sulfate will precipitate out of solution as a whitish powder. This is a common laboratory test to determine if sulfate anions are present.

The sulfate ion can act as a ligand attaching either by one oxygen (monodentate) or by two oxygens as either a chelate or a bridge. An example is the complex  or the neutral metal complex  where the sulfate ion is acting as a bidentate ligand. The metal–oxygen bonds in sulfate complexes can have significant covalent character.

Uses and occurrence

Commercial applications

Sulfates are widely used industrially. Major compounds include:

 Gypsum, the natural mineral form of hydrated calcium sulfate, is used to produce plaster. About 100 million tonnes per year are used by the construction industry.
 Copper sulfate, a common algaecide, the more stable form is used for galvanic cells as electrolyte
 Iron(II) sulfate, a common form of iron in mineral supplements for humans, animals, and soil for plants
 Magnesium sulfate (commonly known as Epsom salts), used in therapeutic baths
 Lead(II) sulfate, produced on both plates during the discharge of a lead–acid battery
 Sodium laureth sulfate, or SLES, a common detergent in shampoo formulations
 Polyhalite, used as fertiliser.

Occurrence in nature
Sulfate-reducing bacteria, some anaerobic microorganisms, such as those living in sediment or near deep sea thermal vents, use the reduction of sulfates coupled with the oxidation of organic compounds or hydrogen as an energy source for chemosynthesis.

History
Some sulfates were known to alchemists. The vitriol salts, from the Latin vitreolum, glassy, were so-called because they were some of the first transparent crystals known. Green vitriol is iron(II) sulfate heptahydrate, ; blue vitriol is copper(II) sulfate pentahydrate,  and white vitriol is zinc sulfate heptahydrate, . Alum, a double sulfate of potassium and aluminium with the formula , figured in the development of the chemical industry.

Environmental effects
Sulfates occur as microscopic particles (aerosols) resulting from fossil fuel and biomass combustion. They increase the acidity of the atmosphere and form acid rain.  The anaerobic sulfate-reducing bacteria Desulfovibrio desulfuricans and D. vulgaris can remove the black sulfate crust that often tarnishes buildings.

Main effects on climate

The main direct effect of sulfates on the climate involves the scattering of light, effectively increasing the Earth's albedo. This effect is moderately well understood and leads to a cooling from the negative radiative forcing of about 0.4 W/m2 relative to pre-industrial values, partially offsetting the larger (about 2.4 W/m2) warming effect of greenhouse gases. The effect is strongly spatially non-uniform, being largest downstream of large industrial areas.

The first indirect effect is also known as the Twomey effect. Sulfate aerosols can act as cloud condensation nuclei and this leads to greater numbers of smaller droplets of water. Many smaller droplets can diffuse light more efficiently than a few larger droplets.

The second indirect effect is the further knock-on effects of having more cloud condensation nuclei. It is proposed that these include the suppression of drizzle, increased cloud height, to facilitate cloud formation at low humidities and longer cloud lifetime. Sulfate may also result in changes in the particle size distribution, which can affect the clouds radiative properties in ways that are not fully understood. Chemical effects such as the dissolution of soluble gases and slightly soluble substances, surface tension depression by organic substances and accommodation coefficient changes are also included in the second indirect effect.

The indirect effects probably have a cooling effect, perhaps up to 2 W/m2, although the uncertainty is very large. Sulfates are therefore implicated in global dimming. Sulfate is also the major contributor to stratospheric aerosol formed by oxidation of sulfur dioxide injected into the stratosphere by impulsive volcanoes such as the 1991 eruption of Mount Pinatubo in the Philippines. This aerosol exerts a cooling effect on climate during its 1-2 year lifetime in the stratosphere.

Hydrogensulfate (bisulfate)

The hydrogensulfate ion, also called the bisulfate ion, is the conjugate base of sulfuric acid. Sulfuric acid is classified as a strong acid; in aqueous solutions it ionizes completely to form hydronium and hydrogensulfate ions. In other words, the sulfuric acid behaves as a Brønsted–Lowry acid and is deprotonated to form hydrogensulfate ion. Hydrogensulfate has a valency of 1. An example of a salt containing the  ion is sodium bisulfate, . In dilute solutions the hydrogensulfate ions also dissociate, forming more hydronium ions and sulfate ions.

Other sulfur oxyanions

See also 
 Sulfonate
 Sulfation and desulfation of lead–acid batteries
 Sulfate-reducing microorganisms

Notes

References

 
Particulates
Sulfur oxyanions

External links
Current global map of aerosol optical thickness]